The Eddie Eagle GunSafe program and its namesake character were developed by the National Rifle Association for children who are generally considered too young to be allowed to handle firearms. While maturity levels vary, the Eddie Eagle program is intended for children of any age from pre-school through third grade.

The NRA encourages parents and other adults to reach out to schools and inform them of the availability of the program. The NRA provides classroom materials for schools and other institutions free of charge.

Effectiveness 
Geoffrey Jackman commented on the study in 2001 that although the Eddie Eagle program "has been promoted heavily, it never has been evaluated formally to prove that it works. If gun safety education gives parents a sense of complacency without fundamentally altering child behavior, then it might do more harm than good."

The NRA reports several examples of program successes in which children who were in live situations where a gun was found lying around did exactly as the program instructed them to. They say that a decline in accidental gun deaths dating from the 1980s is due to the program, a claim that is contested by safety experts.

In contrast, a 2002 study conducted at North Dakota State University aimed to evaluate the effectiveness of gun training programs on preschool children. The study examined the three main targets of the program, teaching children a safety message (what to say when facing a firearm), how to react to a firearm in a controlled setting, and how to react in a real-world situation. The study found that although the Eddie Eagle program was effective at teaching children the safety message (5 out of 11), only 1 out of 11 was able to react correctly to the role play situation, and none of the students were able to react properly in a real-life situation. The authors then concluded that the training program was not effective at keeping children safe.

Training program 
The program, administered in schools by trained law enforcement officers assisted by a volunteer, teaches children a litany to follow should they encounter a firearm: "Stop! Don't touch! Leave the area! Tell an adult!" 
Instructional materials, including workbooks and a video featuring Jason Priestley, can be downloaded at no cost via the Eddie Eagle webpage. The Eddie Eagle mascot costume cost $2800 in 2015.

Origins and impact
Marion Hammer, at the time a lobbyist for the NRA, developed this program in 1988. According to the NRA, "with a firearm present in about half of all American households, young children should learn that firearms are not toys." Hammer won a National Safety Council's Outstanding Community Service Award in 1993 for her work on the program.

In 2004, New York Times "Personal Health" columnist Jane Brody wrote that the NRA underwrote the Eddie Eagle GunSafe Program "in part hoping to avert more stringent gun control laws."

As of 1997, the NRA says it reached 10 million children, and by 2015 it said that the number had grown to 28 million. The program has been mandated for schools in North Carolina and Oregon, and is used in individual school districts across the country.

In 2015, the program was revamped by Tulsa, Oklahoma, advertising agency Ackerman McQueen. The agency has won several local ADDY Awards for its work on the campaign.

Media coverage

In 1999 the ABC News program 20/20 did a feature on Eddie Eagle which was highly critical of the program. This feature stated that it did not work to simply "Tell [very young] kids what to do" and expect them to follow those instructions implicitly. The producers had a group of schoolchildren (aged 3 to 10 years old) watch the Eddie Eagle video along with a presentation by a police officer on gun safety. While the children all appeared to understand the message that guns are not toys, when the children were left alone with prop guns (and a hidden camera capturing their reactions), they all proceeded to use them as if they were toys.  20/20 collaborated with Hardy to recreate her 2002 study featured aired in 2014 reporting results similar to the 1999 feature.

Samantha Bee on her show Full Frontal with Samantha Bee, in a segment accusing the NRA of hypocrisy, contrasted an unsuccessful attempt to acquire an Eddie Eagle costume, noting an 18-page application and 20 day review period, while successfully purchasing several firearms without a background check. In response to the segment the NRA's Institute for Legislative Action noted that the Eddie Eagle mascot is trademarked, to be used "ONLY for the purpose of firearm accident prevention" and subject to private property rights vs. 2nd Amendment rights.

Criticism
Some parents have objected to the program because it assumes there will be guns lying around and makes people comfortable with guns, or because it contradicts their own teachings.

Advocates of safe storage laws intended to protect children from unsupervised access to firearms, such as the proposed  "MaKayla's Law" in Tennessee, complain that the NRA opposes their efforts and promotes Eddie Eagle instead. An early childhood education specialist who helped create the Eddie Eagle program, denies that it is a replacement for safe storage laws.  "No one ever told me that's how the program was going to be used," she says. "If they had, I assure you I wouldn't have had anything to do with it. That's giving way too much significance to the lesson."

The Economist says that the program treats children as the problem rather than guns. It says the NRA sends a mixed message, noting that the organization encourages gun use by children as young as seven or eight years old in its magazine InSights.

The American Academy of Pediatrics has maintained a critical position on the program since 1992 noting a lack of evidence demonstrating efficacy and advocating an absence of guns from children's homes as a more effective alternative.

The gun control advocacy organizations Brady Campaign to Prevent Gun Violence and Violence Policy Center are critical of the program and its efficacy.

References

External links 
 Eddie Eagle
 Joe Camel with feathers : how the NRA with gun and tobacco industry dollars uses its Eddie Eagle program to market guns to kids. - a critical look at the program by the Violence Policy Center

Mascots introduced in 1988
Fictional birds of prey
Male characters in advertising
Firearm safety
National Rifle Association
Public service announcement characters
Bird mascots
Public health education